This is the list of current members of the Provincial Assembly of Sindh elected following the 2013 general election.

References

2013 Pakistani general election